Pola Lednickie 
is a small village in the administrative district of Gmina Kiszkowo, within Gniezno County, Greater Poland Voivodeship, in west-central Poland. It separated from the village of Imiolki on January 1, 2013, to become its own village.

References

Villages in Gniezno County
Populated places established in 2013
2013 establishments in Poland